David Altshuler is an American scholar and museum director.

Career
Altshuler was the Charles E. Smith Professor of Judaic Studies at George Washington University.

He was the founding director of the Museum of Jewish Heritage in New York City, a position he held from 1984 until December 1999, when he left to become president of the Trust for Jewish Philanthropy.

He was a curator of the exhibition, The Precious Legacy, at the Smithsonian's National Museum of Natural History in 1983.

Books
 The Jews of Washington, D.C.: a communal history anthology, editor.  Jewish Historical Society of Greater Washington, Rossel Books, c1985.
 The Precious Legacy: Judaic Treasures from the Czechoslovak State Collection, editor. Exhibit catalogue. (Simon & Schuster, 1983).

References

Directors of museums in the United States
Living people
Year of birth missing (living people)